Bearpen Mountain is a mountain located in the Catskill Mountains of New York. 
Bearpen Mountain is flanked to the north by Roundtop, and to the southeast by Vly Mountain.

The northeast side of Bearpen Mountain drains into Little West Kill, thence into Schoharie Creek, the Mohawk River, the Hudson River, and into New York Bay.
The west side of Bearpen drains into Batavia Kill, thence into the East Branch of the Delaware River, and into Delaware Bay.
The south side of Bearpen drains into Vly Creek, thence into Bush Kill, Dry Brook, and the East Branch of the Delaware.

Bearpen Mountain is well known for its trail system with miles of motorized and hiking trails.

There used to be 3 ski areas here. First, being the Princeton ski bowl, the second being big bear, and the third being no name ski resort. The Princeton ski bowl was the first ski resort ever in the Catskills, and to this day you can find the old world war 2 car rusted at the peak. This car used to be used as a lift that would take you to the second longest trail in the east coast back then. It was also known for its great food and lodging. This link takes you to the origin of these resorts.

https://nyskiblog.com/magazine/eastern-us/bearpen-mountain-ny-original-beast/

See also 
 List of mountains in New York
 New York County High Points

Notes

External links 
 Bearpen Mountain Hiking Information Catskill 3500 Club
 Bearpen Mountain Hike Hiker's information

Mountains of Greene County, New York
Catskill High Peaks
Mountains of Delaware County, New York
Mountains of New York (state)